The  Am9080  was a CPU manufactured by AMD. Originally produced without license as a clone of the Intel 8080, the processor was reverse-engineered by Ashawna Hailey, Kim Hailey and Jay Kumar by photographing an early Intel chip and developing a schematic and logic diagrams from the images. In initial production, the chips cost about 50 cents to make, yielding 100 chips per wafer, and were sold into the military market for $700 each. This CPU operated at a speed of 2 MHz. Later, an agreement was made with Intel to become a licensed second source for the 8080, enabling both manufacturers' chips to break into markets that would not accept a single-sourced part.

References 

Am9080